East-Central Minnesota Pride is the yearly celebration of the lesbian, gay, bisexual, and transgender (LGBT) residents in the rural area near Pine City, Minnesota, United States. At the time of its inception, it was just one of two prides held in a rural community in the U.S. It was also the first pride gathering held outside of a metropolitan area in Minnesota. The celebration is held during the first weekend in June in Pine City, Minnesota.

Background 

East Central Minnesota is made of Pine, Isanti, Chisago, Kanabec, and Mille Lacs counties. The 2010 US Census identified Pine City and its surrounding area home to one of the highest concentration same-sex coupled households of any non-metropolitan areas in the state. To recognize the 5th anniversary of the East Central Men’s Circle which provides support to gay, bisexual, transgender, and questioning men in the area, a picnic was held in 2005. Hundreds of people turned out for the occasion. This event is recognised as the first East Central Minnesota Pride event. East-Central Minnesota Pride became an official nonprofit in 2010. In 2020 the event was canceled to help prevent the spread of COVID-19.

Other communities organizations and groups have since become involved in the planning and running of the event including  East Central Purple Circle, group of Lesbian, Queer & allied women in the region, and East Central Minnesota Parents, Families, and Friends of Lesbians and Gays (PFLAG).

Controversies
Counter-Protests
Early Prides were subject to counter-protests across town in a separate park, and were billed as pro family events.  Rural Pine County residents claimed they were offended by a Pride advertisement stating, "It's okay to be GAY in Pine City", featuring a pink boa on the town's iconic monument, François the Voyageur.

"Bad Apples" Comment
In 2014, Pine County Commissioner Mitch Pangerl called Pride organizers "bad apples" at a County Board meeting for using a community sign on school property to promote the event. The sign referenced was used by more than 20 community groups and nonprofit organizations until East Central Minnesota Pride, also a nonprofit, wanted space to promote its event; then, the school voted to use the sign only for school-related events. 

Host Martina Marraccino
In 2022, concerns were expressed that Marraccino was an inappropriate emcee for the Pride event due to his past experience as a pornographic film actor. The City of Pine City stood by the event and did not withhold any necessary permitting for it to occur.

Awards and nominations

References

External links

 East Central Minnesota Pride - Official Website

LGBT events in Minnesota
Tourist attractions in Pine County, Minnesota
Festivals in Minnesota
Annual events in Minnesota
LGBT in Minnesota
LGBT culture in Minnesota